The 1936 Washington University Bears football team was an American football team that represented Washington University in St. Louis as a member of the Missouri Valley Conference (MVC) during the 1936 college football season. In its fifth season under head coach Jimmy Conzelman, the team compiled a 3–7 record (1–1 against MVC opponents), and outscored opponents by a total of 151 to 123. The team played its home games at Francis Field in St. Louis.

Schedule

References

Washington University
Washington University Bears football seasons
Washington University Bears football